The 1980 Ottawa Rough Riders finished the season in 3rd place in the Eastern Conference with a 7–9 record. They lost the East Semi-Final to the Montreal Alouettes.

Offseason

CFL Draft

Preseason

Regular season

Standings

Schedule

Postseason

Awards and honours

CFL All-Stars
TE – Tony Gabriel
OG – Val Belcher

Eastern All-Stars
RB – Richard Crump
TE – Tony Gabriel
OG – Val Belcher
DT – Mike Raines
LB – Ron Foxx
LB – Rick Sowieta

CFL Awards
CFLPA's Most Outstanding Community Service Award – Jim Coode (OT)

References

Ottawa Rough Riders seasons
1980 Canadian Football League season by team